CactusCon was the fourth North American Science Fiction Convention, held in Phoenix, Arizona, on September 3–7, 1987, at the Hyatt Regency Phoenix, Adams Hilton, and Phoenix Convention Center.  This NASFiC was held because Brighton, England, was selected as the location for the 1987 Worldcon.

Guests of honor
 Hal Clement, pro
 Marjii Ellers, fan
 Julius Schwartz, Toastmaster

Information

Site selection
After "Britain in '87" was selected over the Phoenix bid as the World Science Fiction Convention to be held in 1987 (as "Conspiracy '87" in Brighton, England), the WSFS Business Meeting directed that a written ballot election be held that afternoon to select a NASFiC site for that year. Essentially unopposed, Phoenix was announced as the winner the next day.

Committee
 Chair: Bruce Farr

Events

Notable program participants

See also
 World Science Fiction Society

References

External links
 NASFiC Official Site

North American Science Fiction Convention
Festivals in Phoenix, Arizona
1987 in the United States